Wangshi may refer to the following towns in China:

 Wangshi, Funan County (王堰镇), Anhui
 Wangshi, Lixin County (王市镇), Anhui
 Wangshi, Hubei, in Jianli County, Jingzhou, Hubei
 Wangshi, Liaoning (王石镇), in Haicheng, Liaoning